The 2022 United States Senate election in Alaska was held on November 8, 2022. Incumbent three-term Republican U.S. Senator Lisa Murkowski won reelection to a fourth full term, defeating fellow Republican Kelly Tshibaka and Democrat Patricia Chesbro.

After the voter approval of Ballot Measure 2 during the 2020 Alaska elections, this was the first U.S. Senate election in Alaska to be held under a new election process. All candidates ran in a nonpartisan blanket top-four primary on August 16, 2022, and the top four candidates advanced to the general election, where voters will utilize ranked-choice voting.

Murkowski was appointed to the Senate in 2002 by her father, Frank Murkowski, who served as a U.S. senator from Alaska from 1981 until he was elected to become Governor of Alaska. Murkowski has won three Senate elections since then, including a notable write-in campaign in the 2010 election, although she has never won an election with an outright majority of the vote.

Murkowski was the only Republican senator running for reelection in 2022 who voted to convict former president Donald Trump in his second impeachment trial in 2021. On March 16, 2021, the Alaska Republican Party voted to censure Murkowski and announced that it would recruit a Republican challenger in the 2022 election cycle. Following Murkowski's opposition to some of Trump's initiatives and her vote to convict him, Trump endorsed Tshibaka and campaigned against Murkowski. The Alaska Republican Party endorsed Tshibaka; Republican Senate leader Mitch McConnell and the National Republican Senatorial Committee supported Murkowski.

In addition to Murkowski and Tshibaka, Democrat Pat Chesbro and Republican Buzz Kelley also advanced to the general election. On September 13, Kelley suspended his campaign and endorsed Tshibaka. Murkowski received a plurality of first-place votes, but because no candidate received a majority of the votes in the first round, the instant runoff was triggered. Murkowski won reelection in the third and final round, winning most of the second-choice votes from Chesbro's voters. Since Murkowski won her three previous elections to the US Senate (2004, 2010, and 2016) without a majority of the vote, this election became the fourth election in which she did not receive a majority of the vote in the first round (the other three elections did not employ ranked choice voting with multiple rounds). Murkowski thus holds the record for most number of elections won by a US Senator without winning a majority of the votes.

Candidates

Republican Party

Advanced to general
Lisa Murkowski, incumbent U.S. senator
Kelly Tshibaka, former commissioner of the Alaska Department of Administration

Withdrew after advancing to general
Buzz Kelley, retired mechanic (remained on ballot; endorsed Tshibaka)

Eliminated in primary
Sam Merrill, businessman
Pat Nolin, mechanic
John Schiess, perennial candidate
Kendall L. Shorkey
Karl Speights, retired U.S. Air Force officer and advisor to Donald Trump's 2020 presidential campaign

Disqualified
Sam Little, musician, truck driver, National Guard veteran and candidate for governor of Alaska in 2010

Declined
Mike Dunleavy, governor of Alaska (ran for re-election)
Sarah Palin, former governor of Alaska and nominee for vice president of the United States in 2008 (ran for U.S. House)
Bob Lochner, mechanic and candidate for U.S. Senate in 2016

Democratic Party

Advanced to general
Pat Chesbro, teacher

Eliminated in primary
Edgar Blatchford, professor, former mayor of Seward, and candidate for U.S. Senate in 2016 and 2020
Ivan R. Taylor

Withdrew
Elvi Gray-Jackson, state senator for District I and former Anchorage Assembly member (ran for re-election)

Declined
Mark Begich, former U.S. senator

Libertarian Party

Eliminated in primary
Sean Thorne, veteran

Alaskan Independence Party

Eliminated in primary
Dustin Darden, city maintenance worker and perennial candidate
Joe Stephens

Declined
John Howe, machinist and nominee for U.S. Senate in 2020 (ran for governor)

Independents

Eliminated in primary
Dave Darden, perennial candidate
Shoshana Gungurstein, businesswoman
Sid Hill, political gadfly and candidate for U.S. Senate in 2014
Jeremy Keller, television personality
Huhnkie Lee, attorney, army veteran and Republican candidate for Alaska Senate in 2020

Declined
Al Gross, orthopedic surgeon, commercial fisherman, son of former Alaska Attorney General Avrum Gross, and candidate for U.S. Senate in 2020 (ran for U.S. House)

Endorsements

Primary election

Results

General election

Predictions

Debates and forums

Polling

Lisa Murkowski vs. Kelly Tshibaka

Results

See also 
2022 United States Senate elections
2022 United States House of Representatives election in Alaska
2022 Alaska gubernatorial election
2022 Alaska Senate election
2022 Alaska House of Representatives election
2022 Alaska elections

Notes

Partisan clients

References

External links 
Official campaign websites
 Pat Chesbro (D) for Senate
 Buzz Kelley (R) for Senate
 Lisa Murkowski (R) for Senate
 Kelly Tshibaka (R) for Senate

2022
Alaska
United States Senate